Athelstan Suresh Canagarajah is a Tamil-born Sri Lankan linguist and currently an Edwin Erle Sparks Professor of Applied linguistics, English, and Asian studies at Pennsylvania State University, where he has been a member of the faculty since 2007. His research covers World Englishes and teaching English to speakers of other languages. He has published works on translingualism, translanguaging, linguistic imperialism, and social and political issues in language education. His book, Translingual Practice: Global Englishes and Cosmopolitan Relations, has won three nationally recognized best book awards.

Selected publications 

 Translingual Practice: Global Englishes and Cosmopolitan Relations. New York and Abingdon: Routledge, 2013. pp. xxii-230. 
 Canagarajah, A. (1999). Resisting linguistic imperialism in English language teaching. Oxford: Oxford University Press.

Notable awards 

 American Association for Applied Linguistics (AAAL) 2020 Best Book Award for Routledge Handbook for Migration and Language
 American Association for Applied Linguistics (AAAL) 2016 Inaugural Best Book Award for Translingual Practice: Global Englishes and Cosmopolitan Relations 
 British Association for Applied Linguistics (BAAL) 2014 Book Prize for Translingual Practice: Global Englishes and Cosmopolitan Relations
 Modern Language Association of America 2012-2013 Mina P. Shaughnessy Award for Translingual Practice: Global Englishes and Cosmopolitan Relations
 Conference on College Composition and Communication (CCCC) 2007 Richard Braddock Award for “The Place of World Englishes in Composition: Pluralization Continued" 
 Modern Language Association of America 1999 Mina P. Shaughnessy Award for Resisting Linguistic Imperialism in English Teaching

References

External links 
 homepage 

Year of birth missing (living people)
Living people
Applied linguists
Linguists from Sri Lanka
Sociolinguists
Pennsylvania State University faculty
University of Texas at Austin College of Liberal Arts alumni
Bowling Green State University alumni
Linguists from the United States
Presidents of the American Association for Applied Linguistics